Priestlands School is a coeducational secondary school located in Pennington, Hampshire in southern England. The school serves an area that includes the villages of Beaulieu, Brockenhurst, East Boldre, Hordle, Norleywood, Pilley, South Baddesley, Sway and the towns of Lymington and Milford-on-Sea.

History 
The oldest part of the school, built circa 1800, and the grounds were once the home of Rear-admiral John Peyton who commanded  at the Battle of the Nile in 1798.

The school was founded in 1957.

Previously a community school and specialist arts college, in August 2011 the school converted to academy status. A 2008 Ofsted inspection assessed the school as Grade 1 (Outstanding). In 2012 it was judged Good. As of 2022, the school's most recent inspection was a short inspection in 2016 which found that the school remains Good.

World record attempt
In 2012 the school attempted to set the world record for most people standing on one leg for two minutes with 892 people. However, a problem with the video resulted in insufficient evidence for the record to be officially recognised.

Walled Garden and environment
A student group called "The Eco-Warriors" restored an 18th-century walled garden in the grounds with pigs, bees, and chickens in 2008.

The school achieved Eco-Schools silver in 2012.

Notable alumni

Paul Rideout (b. August 1964), footballer
Adamski (b. December 1967 as Adam Tinley), musician
Russell Perrett (b. June 1973), footballer
Sam Vokes (b. October 1989), footballer
Jordan Rose (b. November 1989), footballer
Josh McQuoid (b. December 1989), footballer
Birdy (b. May 1996 as Jasmine van den Bogaerde), musician
Joe Quigley (b. December 1996), footballer
Belle Delphine (b. October 1999), Internet personality

References

Academies in Hampshire
Secondary schools in Hampshire
1957 establishments in England
Educational institutions established in 1957
Lymington